David Marrero Santana (born 8 April 1980) is a Spanish professional tennis player. Marrero won 14 doubles titles and reaching a career-high doubles ranking of world No. 5 in November 2013.

Professional career

2000–2007 
Marrero earned his first world ranking late in 2000 as a 20-year-old, but he spent only a few weeks inside the top-500 until early 2005. By late 2005, he had made it into the top-300, but faded over the next year to close out 2006 outside the top-400. In the middle of 2007, he again inched into the top-300, but faded again to close out 2007 at No. 362.

2008 
As a qualifier, Marrero reached the final of a Challenger in Chile in January, losing to No. 132 Rubén Ramírez Hidalgo after upsetting No. 272 Sebastián Decoud, No. 187 Adrián García and No. 111 Nicolás Lapentti. This result brought him back into the top 300 at World No. 289. The very next week he gained revenge over Ramirez-Hidalgo to qualify into an ATP stop in Chile, where he again beat García before losing to No. 104 Fabio Fognini in the 2nd round. In February, Marrero scored another upset, defeating World No. 114 Máximo González.

2009–2013: ATP tour finals and World No. 5 in doubles 
Marrero reached his career-high singles ranking of World No. 143 on 8 February 2010 and career-high ranking of World No. 5 in doubles on 11 November 2013 after winning the ATP World Tour Finals with Fernando Verdasco defeating the Bryan Brothers.

2016: Match fixing controversy

In January 2016, Marrero was featured in a New York Times article about his suspected match-fixing at the Australian Open.

2022
He announced his retirement at the 2022 Barcelona Open Banc Sabadell 
  but continued to play in ITF and Challenger circuit.

Significant finals

Year-end championships finals

Doubles: 1 (1 title)

Masters 1000 finals

Doubles: 2 (1 title, 1 runner-up)

ATP career finals

Doubles: 30 (14 titles, 16 runner-ups)

Challenger and Futures finals

Singles: 16 (8–8)

Doubles: 60 (33–27)

Doubles performance timeline

References

External links
 
 
 
 Marrero recent match results
 Marrero world ranking history

1980 births
Living people
Sportspeople from Alicante
Sportspeople from Las Palmas
Spanish male tennis players